Teagan Clive (born c. 1955) is an American writer, bodybuilder and actress. She has appeared in various roles in movies and on television.

Clive writes articles for periodicals, including Iron Man Magazine and the Weider magazine Muscle & Fitness, and has since the 1980s. She wrote screenplays which were produced for the television series Conan the Adventurer and Acapulco H.E.A.T.

She is married to writer Stan Berkowitz.

Early life
Clive was abandoned as a baby, and was cared for by a series of institutions and foster homes. In public school and college she pursued athletic curricula including baseball and varsity volleyball.

Early training
In 1983, Clive began training with Don Ross at the Olympia Health Club in Oakland, California, where she told him, "I want to be the Arnold Schwarzenegger of female bodybuilding."

Acting career

Filmography

Television appearances
The Incredibly Strange Film Show, season 2, episode 5: "Fred Olen Ray & Doris Wishman". A UK documentary program which in 1988 took a behind the scenes look at Alienator.
Clive, not Kay Baxter is the female bodybuilder in "California Girls", the David Lee Roth music video, which premiered on MTV New Year's Eve, 1984.

Writing career

Journalist
Clive wrote the "Power Café" diet column in Iron Man for 14 years.

In the 1990s Sports Illustrated hired Clive to investigate murder in bodybuilding, but she declined to capitalize on her work because her "participation in the project was met with so much disapproval" among her friends in the sport.

Television screenplays
Acapulco H.E.A.T. "Code Name: Cult Zero" (March 13, 1999)
Acapulco H.E.A.T. "Code Name: Bucket of Blood" (March 6, 1999)
Conan: The Adventurer "Lethal Wizards" (May 17, 1998) (with Charles Henry Fabian)
Conan: The Adventurer "Impostor" (November 28, 1997) (with Charles Henry Fabian)
Conan: The Adventurer "The Siege of Ahl Sohn-Bar" (October 13, 1997) (with Charles Henry Fabian)

Books
Body Sculpturing (Getting Strong) Anderson World Books (1984)

References

External links

Filmography at The New York Times website
Teagan Talks interview

American film actresses
1959 births
Living people
American female bodybuilders
21st-century American women